Forness Stadium was a stadium in Olean, New York.  It opened in 1946 and was home to the St. Bonaventure University football team from 1946 to 1951. 

The stadium was built in 1946 in a period of 77 days. It seated 12,000 persons and was named for former Olean mayor Fred Forness. The construction of the stadium helped persuade Notre Dame football coach to become St. Bonaventure's football coach starting with the 1946 season.

The stadium was dedicated on September 28, 1946, during a game against Youngstown. Youngstown won the game by a 20–14 score.

The final game in the stadium was also played against , on November 3, 1951. St. Bonaventure won the final game by a 39–6 score. In February 1952, St. Bonaventure announced that it was suspending competition in intercollegiate football. 

The stadium remained vacant for several years after the football program was suspended. One sports writer described the stadium during this period as "lying there ever since, unburied, like Ebbetts Field, or Leadville or the old Slave Market in St. Augustine."  In 1959 and 1960, the school dismantled the stadium in 1959. Portions of the bleachers went to Allegheny High School and Mount Morris. Other portions were sold at auction.

References

Defunct college football venues
Demolished sports venues in New York (state)
Multi-purpose stadiums in the United States
1946 establishments in New York (state)
Sports venues completed in 1946
1960 disestablishments in New York (state)
Sports venues demolished in 1960
American football venues in New York (state)
College track and field venues in the United States
Athletics (track and field) venues in New York (state)
Defunct athletics (track and field) venues in the United States